The 79th Street Crosstown Line  is a bus line in Manhattan, New York City, running mostly along 79th Street on the Upper West and Upper East Sides of Manhattan. Originally a bus route owned by the private Green Bus Lines, it now comprises the M79 Select Bus Service bus line.

The M79 local bus route was identified as a heavily traveled corridor in a 2009 study by the DOT and NYCTA, and in a December 2013 study by the Pratt Center for Community Development of Brooklyn. It was converted to SBS on May 21, 2017.

Route description 

The M79 bus runs crosstown along 79th Street in Upper Manhattan. The route begins at West 79th Street and Riverside Drive in the Upper West Side. It proceeds east along 79th Street to Amsterdam Avenue, where the eastbound bus then follows 79th Street to Amsterdam Avenue and uses Amsterdam Avenue to get to 81st Street, and the westbound bus uses 81st Street to get to Columbus Avenue and then take that down to 79th Street. After Central Park West, the bus then crosses the 79th Street Transverse through the park, stopping about halfway through the transverse. The M79 exits the transverse at East 79th Street and 5th Avenue, continuing on East 79th Street through the Upper East Side until turning left onto York Avenue and then right again onto 80th Street before arriving to its terminus at 80th Street. The bus then turns right on East End Avenue and then right onto 79th Street to start its westbound route.

The westbound bus then continues on 79th Street to Fifth Avenue. After this, the bus keeps straight and merges onto the 79th Street Transverse. It then leaves the Transverse on the intersection of Central Park West and 81st Street and continues along 81st Street to Columbus Avenue and then turns left onto it and then turns right onto 79th Street 2 blocks later. It continues along 79th Street to its westbound terminus at Riverside Drive.

Unlike other SBS routes and most bus rapid transit lines, the M79 SBS does not have long bus lanes, but rather employs short queue jump lanes, which give buses priority at intersections.

History

Early history
On November 30, 1921, the New York City Department of Plants and Structures began operating the M17 bus on 79th Street. From 1933 to 1936 the bus line was taken over by Green Bus Lines. On June 22, 1936, the New York City Omnibus Corporation became in charge of M17 traffic. Route M17 became M79 in March 1989.

Select Bus Service
The M79 was identified as a potential bus rapid transit corridor in 2009, under Phase II of the city's Select Bus Service program. To accommodate the Select Bus Service conversion, 79th Street was to be renovated with plants and trees, and new benches.

The M79 SBS route debuted on May 21, 2017. The M79 SBS is based at the Michael J. Quill Depot.

In popular culture
 The route is mentioned in a Vampire Weekend song of the same name on their self-titled debut album.

References

External links

 M79 Select Bus Service − mta.info
 79th Street Select Bus Service − NYCDOT

M079
079